Darreh Rahmaneh (also Romanized as Darreh Raḩmāneh; also known as Darreh Raḩmāneh-ye Somāq) is a village in Teshkan Rural District, Chegeni District, Dowreh County, Lorestan Province, Iran. At the 2006 census, its population was 84, in 16 families.

References 

Towns and villages in Dowreh County